Herpesviridae is a large family of DNA viruses that cause infections and certain diseases in animals, including humans. The members of this family are also known as herpesviruses. The family name is derived from the Greek word ἕρπειν ( 'to creep'), referring to spreading cutaneous lesions, usually involving blisters, seen in flares of herpes simplex 1, herpes simplex 2 and herpes zoster (shingles). In 1971, the International Committee on the Taxonomy of Viruses (ICTV) established Herpesvirus as a genus with 23 viruses among four groups. As of 2020, 115 species are recognized, all but one of which are in one of the three subfamilies. Herpesviruses can cause both latent and lytic infections. 

More than 90% of adults have been infected with at least one of these, and a latent form of the virus remains in almost all humans who have been infected. Other human herpesviruses are human herpesvirus 6A and 6B (HHV-6A and HHV-6B), human herpesvirus 7 (HHV-7), and Kaposi's sarcoma-associated herpesvirus (KSHV, also known as HHV-8).

In total,  more than 130 herpesviruses are known, some of them from mammals, birds, fish, reptiles, amphibians, and molluscs. Among the animal herpesviruses are pseudorabies virus causing Aujeszky's disease in pigs, and bovine herpesvirus 1 causing bovine infectious rhinotracheitis and pustular vulvovaginitis.

Taxonomy 
 Subfamily Alphaherpesvirinae
 Iltovirus
 Mardivirus
 Scutavirus
 Simplexvirus
 Varicellovirus
 Subfamily Betaherpesvirinae
 Cytomegalovirus
 Muromegalovirus
 Proboscivirus
 Quwivirus
 Roseolovirus
 Subfamily Gammaherpesvirinae
 Bossavirus
 Lymphocryptovirus
 Macavirus
 Manticavirus
 Patagivirus
 Percavirus
 Rhadinovirus

Additionally, the species Iguanid herpesvirus 2 is currently unassigned to a genus and subfamily.

See Herpesvirales#Taxonomy for information on taxonomic history, phylogenetic research, and the nomenclatural system.

Structure 

All members of the Herpesviridae share a common structure; a relatively large, monopartite, double-stranded, linear DNA genome encoding 100-200 genes encased within an icosahedral protein cage (with T=16 symmetry) called the capsid, which is itself wrapped in a protein layer called the tegument containing both viral proteins and viral mRNAs and a lipid bilayer membrane called the envelope. This whole particle is known as a virion.
The structural components of a typical HSV virion are the Lipid bilayer envelope, Tegument, DNA, Glycoprotein spikes and Nucleocapsid. The four-component Herpes simplex virion encompasses the double-stranded DNA genome into an icosahedral nucleocapsid. There is tegument around. Tegument contains filaments, each 7 nm wide. It is an amorphous layer with some structured regions. Finally, it is covered with a lipoprotein envelope. There are spikes made of glycoprotein protruding from each virion. These can expand the diameter of the virus to 225 nm. The diameters of virions without spikes are around 186 nm. There are at least two unglycosylated membrane proteins in the outer envelope of the virion. There are also 11 glycoproteins. These are gB, gC, gD, gE, gG, gH, gI, gJ, gK, gL and gM. Tegument contains 26 proteins. They have duties such as capsid transport to the nucleus and other organelles, activation of early gene transcription, and mRNA degradation. The icosahedral nucleocapsid is similar to that of tailed bacteriophage in the order Caudovirales. This capsid has 161 capsomers consisting of 150 hexons and 11 pentons, as well as a portal complex that allows entry and exit of DNA into the capsid.

Life cycle 
All herpesviruses are nuclear-replicating—the viral DNA is transcribed to mRNA within the infected cell's nucleus.

Infection is initiated when a viral particle contacts a cell with specific types of receptor molecules on the cell surface.  Following binding of viral envelope glycoproteins to cell membrane receptors, the virion is internalized and dismantled, allowing viral DNA to migrate to the cell nucleus. Within the nucleus, replication of viral DNA and transcription of viral genes occurs.

During symptomatic infection, infected cells transcribe lytic viral genes. In some host cells, a small number of viral genes termed latency-associated transcript (LAT) accumulate, instead. In this fashion, the virus can persist in the cell (and thus the host) indefinitely. While primary infection is often accompanied by a self-limited period of clinical illness, long-term latency is symptom-free.

Chromatin dynamics regulate the transcription competency of entire herpes virus genomes. When the virus enters a cell, the cellular immune response is to protect the cell. The cell does so by wrapping the viral DNA around histones and condensing it into chromatin, causing the virus to become dormant, or latent. If cells are unsuccessful and the chromatin is loosely bundled, the viral DNA is still accessible. The viral particles can turn on their genes and replicate using cellular machinery to reactivate, starting a lytic infection.

Reactivation of latent viruses has been implicated in a number of diseases (e.g. shingles, pityriasis rosea).  Following activation, transcription of viral genes transitions from LAT to multiple lytic genes; these lead to enhanced replication and virus production. Often, lytic activation leads to cell death. Clinically, lytic activation is often accompanied by emergence of nonspecific symptoms, such as low-grade fever, headache, sore throat, malaise, and rash, as well as clinical signs such as swollen or tender lymph nodes and immunological findings such as reduced levels of natural killer cells.

In animal models, local trauma and system stress have been found to induce reactivation of latent herpesvirus infection. Cellular stressors like transient interruption of protein synthesis and hypoxia are also sufficient to induce viral reactivation.

Evolution 
The three mammalian subfamilies – Alpha-, Beta- and Gamma-herpesviridae – arose approximately 180 to 220 mya. The major sublineages within these subfamilies were probably generated before the mammalian radiation of 80 to 60 mya. Speciations within sublineages took place in the last 80 million years probably with a major component of cospeciation with host lineages.

All the currently known bird and reptile species are alphaherpesviruses. Although the branching order of the herpes viruses has not yet been resolved, because herpes viruses and their hosts tend to coevolve this is suggestive that the alphaherpesviruses may have been the earliest branch.

The time of origin of the genus Iltovirus has been estimated to be 200 mya while those of the mardivirus and simplex genera have been estimated to be between 150 and 100 mya.

Immune system evasions 

Herpesviruses are known for their ability to establish lifelong infections. One way this is possible is through immune evasion. Herpesviruses have many different ways of evading the immune system. One such way is by encoding a protein mimicking human interleukin 10 (hIL-10) and another is by downregulation of the major histocompatibility complex II (MHC II) in infected cells.

cmvIL-10 
Research conducted on cytomegalovirus (CMV) indicates that the viral human IL-10 homolog, cmvIL-10, is important in inhibiting pro-inflammatory cytokine synthesis. The cmvIL-10 protein has 27% identity with hIL-10 and only one conserved residue out of the nine amino acids that make up the functional site for cytokine synthesis inhibition on hIL-10. There is, however, much similarity in the functions of hIL-10 and cmvIL-10. Both have been shown to down regulate IFN-γ, IL-1α, GM-CSF, IL-6 and TNF-α, which are all pro-inflammatory cytokines. They have also been shown to play a role in downregulating MHC I and MHC II and up regulating HLA-G (non-classical MHC I). These two events allow for immune evasion by suppressing the cell-mediated immune response and natural killer cell response, respectively. The similarities between hIL-10 and cmvIL-10 may be explained by the fact that hIL-10 and cmvIL-10 both use the same cell surface receptor, the hIL-10 receptor.  One difference in the function of hIL-10 and cmvIL-10 is that hIL-10 causes human peripheral blood mononuclear cells (PBMC) to both increase and decrease in proliferation whereas cmvIL-10 only causes a decrease in proliferation of PBMCs. This indicates that cmvIL-10 may lack the stimulatory effects that hIL-10 has on these cells.

It was found that cmvIL-10 functions through phosphorylation of the Stat3 protein. It was originally thought that this phosphorylation was a result of the JAK-STAT pathway. However, despite evidence that JAK does indeed phosphorylate Stat3, its inhibition has no significant influence on cytokine synthesis inhibition. Another protein, PI3K, was also found to phosphorylate Stat3. PI3K inhibition, unlike JAK inhibition, did have a significant impact on cytokine synthesis. The difference between PI3K and JAK in Stat3 phosphorylation is that PI3K phosphorylates Stat3 on the S727 residue whereas JAK phosphorylates Stat3 on the Y705 residue. This difference in phosphorylation positions seems to be the key factor in Stat3 activation leading to inhibition of pro-inflammatory cytokine synthesis. In fact, when a PI3K inhibitor is added to cells, the cytokine synthesis levels are significantly restored. The fact that cytokine levels are not completely restored indicates there is another pathway activated by cmvIL-10 that is inhibiting cytokine system synthesis. The proposed mechanism is that cmvIL-10 activates PI3K which in turn activates PKB (Akt). PKB may then activate mTOR, which may target Stat3 for phosphorylation on the S727 residue.

MHC downregulation 
Another one of the many ways in which herpes viruses evade the immune system is by down regulation of MHC I and MHC II. This is observed in almost every human herpesvirus. Down regulation of MHC I and MHC II can come about by many different mechanisms, most causing the MHC to be absent from the cell surface. As discussed above, one way is by a viral chemokine homolog such as IL-10. Another mechanism to down regulate MHCs is to encode viral proteins that detain the newly formed MHC in the endoplasmic reticulum (ER). The MHC cannot reach the cell surface and therefore cannot activate the T cell response. The MHCs can also be targeted for destruction in the proteasome or lysosome. The ER protein TAP also plays a role in MHC down regulation. Viral proteins inhibit TAP preventing the MHC from picking up a viral antigen peptide. This prevents proper folding of the MHC and therefore the MHC does not reach the cell surface.

Human herpesvirus types 
Below are the nine distinct viruses in this family known to cause disease in humans.

Zoonotic herpesviruses 
In addition to the herpesviruses considered endemic in humans, some viruses associated primarily with animals may infect humans.  These are zoonotic infections:

Animal herpesviruses 
In animal virology, the best known herpesviruses belong to the subfamily Alphaherpesvirinae. Research on pseudorabies virus (PrV), the causative agent of Aujeszky's disease in pigs, has pioneered animal disease control with genetically modified vaccines. PrV is now extensively studied as a model for basic processes during lytic herpesvirus infection, and for unraveling molecular mechanisms of herpesvirus neurotropism, whereas bovine herpesvirus 1, the causative agent of bovine infectious rhinotracheitis and pustular vulvovaginitis, is analyzed to elucidate molecular mechanisms of latency. The avian infectious laryngotracheitis virus is phylogenetically distant from these two viruses and serves to underline similarity and diversity within the Alphaherpesvirinae.

Research 

Research is currently ongoing into a variety of side-effect or co-conditions related to the herpesviruses. These include:

 Alzheimer's disease
 atherosclerosis
 cholangiocarcinoma
 chronic fatigue syndrome
 Crohn's disease
 dysautonomia
 fibromyalgia
 Irritable bowel syndrome
 labile hypertension
 lupus
 Ménière's disease
 multiple sclerosis
 pancreatic cancer
 pancreatitis
 pityriasis rosea
 Type II Diabetes

See also 
 Acciptrid herpesvirus 1
 Agua Preta virus, a potential herpesvirus

References

External links 

 ICTV International Committee on Taxonomy of Viruses (official site)
 Viralzone: Herpesviridae
 Animal viruses
 Article on Cercopithecine herpesvirus
 National B Virus Resource Center
 Pityriasis Rosea overview
 Herpes simplex: Host viral protein interactions.A database of Host/HSV-1 interactions
 Virus Pathogen Database and Analysis Resource (ViPR): Herpesviridae

 
Animal virology
Infectious causes of cancer
Virus families
Viral diseases